Meghan Lorence is an American ice hockey forward, currently playing for the Minnesota Whitecaps of the Premier Hockey Federation (PHF).

Career 
Across 4 years at the University of Minnesota, Lorence put up 102 points in 158 games, serving as an assistant captain in her final year. The team would be NCAA national champions three times during her tenure.

In 2019, she signed her first professional contract with the Minnesota Whitecaps of the NWHL. She was named to the 2020 NWHL All-Star Game.

International  
In 2010, she represented the US at the U18 IIHF U18 Women's World Championships, winning a silver medal.

References

External links
 

 
Minnesota Whitecaps players
1992 births
Living people
People from Ramsey County, Minnesota
American women's ice hockey forwards
Ice hockey players from Minnesota
Premier Hockey Federation players
Minnesota Golden Gophers women's ice hockey players